The 1959–60 season was the 68th season in Liverpool F.C.'s existence, and was their sixth consecutive year in the Second Division.

Pre-season
On 12 June, having spent three years at Liverpool and missing only six matches, 29-year-old goalkeeper Tommy Younger was allowed to leave to take on a player-manager role at Scottish Second Division side Falkirk. In exchange, Liverpool signed Falkirk's 23-year-old goalkeeper Bert Slater. Slater had made 134 appearances for Falkirk, winning a Scottish Cup winners medal in the process, before the club were relegated at the end of the 1958-59 season. Slater was small for a goalkeeper standing at just  and was nicknamed 'Shorty' but he was immediately put into the Liverpool goal upon his arrival.

There were promotions to the first-team for local-born 22-year-old defender John Nicholson and 18-year-old inside forward Willie Carlin - the latter a promising youngster who had represented his country at schoolboy and youth levels; 19-year-old full back Alan Jones, a Welsh schoolboy international who had signed professional forms for Liverpool two years earlier; Wrexham-born forward Reginald Blore who had risen through the junior ranks at Anfield; 17-year-old midfielder Ian Callaghan from Toxteth, considered by Liverpool legend Billy Liddell to be his successor; and 20-year-old striker Roger Hunt, signed a year earlier by Phil Taylor when he was brought to his attention playing for Stockton Heath.

Season Summary
The early stages of the campaign saw Liverpool struggle for consistency, putting manager Phil Taylor under increasing pressure after his previous three seasons in charge had all resulted in narrow failures to achieve promotion. The situation further deteriorated when Liverpool failed to win a single match in October, and while a victory over Aston Villa at the start of November gave hope that the club might have turned the corner, it was followed by a humiliating 4-2 loss to strugglers Lincoln City. This proved the end of the road for Taylor, who resigned three days later with the team stuck in 11th place. First team trainer Bob Paisley stepped in as caretaker manager for the next two matches, which saw a 4-3 win over Leyton Orient, and then a 1-0 loss to Huddersfield Town. As it turned out, it would be the Yorkshire side who would provide Liverpool with their next manager, as Bill Shankly accepted the offer to take over at Anfield shortly after the match.

Liverpool's form picked up under Shankly, leaving a promotion challenge suddenly looking feasible after all. In the end, their mediocre early-season form and then another poor spell of form around Easter would leave promotion out of their hands, though a third-place finish still represented an improvement of one place on the previous season.

Squad

Goalkeepers
  Doug Rudham
  Bert Slater

Defenders
  Gerry Byrne
  Alan Jones
  John Molyneux
  Ronnie Moran
  John Nicholson
  Geoff Twentyman
  Dick White

Midfielders
  Alan A'Court
  Reginald Blore
  Ian Callaghan
  Bobby Campbell
  Jimmy Harrower
  Tommy Leishman
  Billy Liddell
  Jimmy Melia
  Fred Morris
  Johnny Morrissey
  Johnny Wheeler
  Barry Wilkinson

Forwards
  Alan Arnell
  Alan Banks
  Louis Bimpson
  Willie Carlin
  Dave Hickson
  Roger Hunt
  Bobby Murdoch

Results

Second Division

FA Cup

References
 LFC History.net – 1959–60 season
 Liverweb - 1959–60 Season

Liverpool F.C. seasons
Liverpool